Asa Foster may refer to:

Asa Lansford Foster, American businessman and geologist
Asa Belknap Foster, Canadian politician and businessman